.

Sir Arthur Harris, 1st Baronet (c. 1650 – 1686) of Hayne in the parish of Stowford in Devon (about 11 miles south-west of Okehampton), was four-times elected as a Member of Parliament for Okehampton in Devon, between 1671 and 1685.

Origins
He was the only son and heir of John Harris (c. 1586 – 1657) of Hayne in the parish of Stowford in Devon and of St. Michael's Mount in Cornwall, a Member of Parliament, by his second wife Cordelia Mohun daughter of John Mohun, 1st Baron Mohun of Okehampton.

Career
He succeeded his father on 6 March 1657. In 1671 he was elected a Member of Parliament for Okehampton. He was created a baronet "of Stowford" on 1 December 1673. He was re-elected MP for Okehampton in the two elections of 1679 and in 1681.

Marriage
He married (by licence dated 5 June 1673) Theophila Turner (d. 1702), a daughter of John Turner,  Serjeant-at-Law, of St Bride's in the City of London, and of York, by his wife Jane Pepys, a remote cousin of the diarist Samuel Pepys. The marriage was childless. She survived her husband and died at Greenwich and was buried on 27 July 1702 at Lifton.

Death and burial
He died at the age of about 36 and was buried on 20 February 1685/6 at Lifton, near Hayne, when the baronetcy became extinct.

References

1650 births
1686 deaths
English MPs 1661–1679
Baronets in the Baronetage of England
Members of the Parliament of England for Okehampton